The Charybdis Icefalls are a large group of crevassed icefalls joining the lower portion of Harlin Glacier to the Rennick Glacier in Victoria Land, Antarctica. The feature is nourished in part by the Lovejoy Glacier, which flows eastward, parallel to and north of the Harlin Glacier before coalescing with it. The falls were first mapped by the United States Geological Survey (1962–63) and the New Zealand Geological Survey Antarctic Expedition (NZGSAE) (1963–64), and named by the latter after Charybdis, the fearsome whirlpool monster of Greek mythology. The icefalls lies situated on the Pennell Coast, a portion of Antarctica lying between Cape Williams and Cape Adare.

References
 

Icefalls of Antarctica
Landforms of Victoria Land
Pennell Coast